LaRue Harrington (June 28, 1957 – March 2, 2017) was an American football running back. He played for the San Diego Chargers in 1980 and for the Los Angeles Express from 1983 to 1984.

He died of a heart attack on March 2, 2017, at age 59.

References

1957 births
2017 deaths
American football running backs
Norfolk State Spartans football players
San Diego Chargers players
Los Angeles Express players